Campo de Robledo is a subcomarca in the comarca of Comarca de Ciudad Rodrigo in the province of Salamanca, Castile and León.  It contains five municipalities:  El Bodón, Casillas de Flores, La Encina, Fuenteguinaldo and Pastores.

References 

Comarcas of the Province of Salamanca